Downtown Boca Grande Historic District is a national historic district located at Boca Grande, Florida in Lee County. In the district are located a collection of residential and commercial buildings built between 1900 and 1953.

It was added to the National Register of Historic Places in 2011.

References

External links

National Register of Historic Places in Lee County, Florida
Historic districts on the National Register of Historic Places in Florida
Gasparilla Island